Klement Zguri (born 21 October 1957) is a member of the Central Election Commission for the Democratic Party of Albania.

References

Living people
Electoral commissioners of Albania
1957 births
People from Shijak